The silver pikeconger (Hoplunnis pacifica) is an eel in the family Nettastomatidae (duckbill/witch eels). It was described by E. David Lane and Kenneth W. Stewart in 1968. It is a marine, tropical eel which is known from the eastern Pacific Ocean.

References

Nettastomatidae
Fish described in 1968